Aethes conversana is a moth of the  family Tortricidae. It was described by Walsingham in 1907. It is found on the Canary Islands, and in Spain and Iran.

The forewings are white with a faint subochreous suffusion and a few sparsely sprinkled black scales. The hindwings are pale brownish grey.

The larvae possibly feed on Artemisia canariensis.

References

conversana
Moths described in 1907
Moths of Europe
Moths of Asia